Debipur is a village located at Memari I block in Purba Bardhaman district. People called Debipur R.S. because there is a Railway Station. It is under Memari police station. Nearest railway station is Debipur railway station, which is under Eastern Railway and is a part of Kolkata Suburban Railway system. Debipur Railway Station is located in Alipur. Nearest towns near Debipur are Memari, Boinchi. Debipur R.S is a Post Office of many other villages like Alipur, Debipur R.S., Mobarakpur. There is two High School and many primary schools

Geography

It is a small village having some beautiful sides of rural India. It is 78 km from Kolkata via Howrah-Bardhaman main line. G.T Road/State Highway 13 (West Bengal) goes through the edge of this village. A D.V.C. canal flows through the middle of this village. Additional areas are Mobarakpur, Gram Debipur.

Demographics
According to 2011 Census, Debipur had total population of 3175. Among total population, males constitute 50.61% (1607 males) and females constitute 49.38% (1568) of total population. Average literacy rate of this village is 63.46%. 1562 persons are total workers among total population (3175). In total workers, there 70.74% population are directly or indirectly involved in agriculture.

Economy
Some basic facilities like banks, ATMs, daily needs shops are available here. There are three banks near Debipur Railway.

This village's all sides are surrounded by agricultural lands. Main occupation among the villagers is agriculture, service & business .

Education
There are two primary schools and three higher secondary schools in this village (Debipur Station High School for both boys' and girls', Debipur Girl's High School and Debipur Adarsha High School).

Culture 
Kali Puja is the main festival of this place.
Saraswsti Puja is another main festival of this place.
SnanJatra is also a main Festival in Mobarockpur Village of Debipur

Famous Personality 
Dr. Sunil Kumar Das (ex Headmaster of Hare School,Kolkata) belongs to Debipur Village
The 60’ high Lakshmi Janardana temple established by the Singh family has rich terracotta carvings.

David J. McCutchion describes the Lakshmi Janardana temple (1844) as a rekha deul with ek-bangla porch. There is rich terracotta decoration on three sides of the porch. Particular mention has been made of vegetal/ floral motifs.

References

 http://www.censusindia.gov.in/pca/SearchDetails.aspx?Id=334276

Villages in Purba Bardhaman district